Nebraska Highway 137 is a highway in northern Nebraska.  Its southern terminus is at U.S. Highway 20 in Newport.  Its northern terminus is at the South Dakota border where it continues as South Dakota Highway 47.

Route description
Nebraska Highway 137 begins in Newport at an intersection with US 20. It heads northward, passing through numerous unincorporated areas of farmland along the way. NE 137 then splits off to the north, where it passes through the Jamison unincorporated area. It then continues northward to the South Dakota border, where it continues in that state as SD 47.

Major intersections

References

External links

Nebraska Roads: NE 121-192

137
Transportation in Rock County, Nebraska
Transportation in Keya Paha County, Nebraska